The At-Tauhid Mosque is an Islamic house of worship in Floresta neighbourhood of Buenos Aires, Argentina. It is the oldest mosque in the country, having been inaugurated in October 1983 by the Shia community of Buenos Aires and with the support of the Embassy of the Islamic Republic of Iran to Argentina. It is a very simple building with a subtle Islamic style in its facade.

It is located on Felipe Vallese St. 3614.

See also

 List of mosques in the Americas
 Lists of mosques

References

External links
 Official website 

Shia mosques in Argentina
Buildings and structures in Buenos Aires
Religious buildings and structures in Buenos Aires
Mosques completed in 1983
Argentina–Iran relations